Nowa Sól is a city on the Oder River in Lubusz Voivodeship, western Poland. It is the capital of Nowa Sól County and had a population of 38,763 (2019).

History
The first settlement in the region of modern Nowa Sól dates to the 14th century, when the territory was under Bohemian sovereignty as part of the Holy Roman Empire. In order to break Silesia's dependency on salt from Poland, Emperor Ferdinand I founded the demesne land Zum Neuen Saltze in 1563. The sea salt, originally from La Rochelle and the Iberian coast, was transported from Hamburg and Stettin (Szczecin) along the navigable Oder. A flood in 1573 led to the relocation of the salt refinery to the nearby village of Modritz (Modrzyca); the office of the administrator is now the town hall. The settlement was documented as Neusalzburg ("New Salzburg") in 1585 and later as Neusalz ("New Salt"). A trading harbor was built on the Oder in 1592. The Protestant Church of St. Michael, built from 1591 to 1597, was converted to Roman Catholicism in 1654.

The entrance of Dutch and English merchants in the Baltic Sea at the end of the 16th century led to difficulties in the supply of unrefined salt. The unprofitable enterprise was also hampered by tolls on the Oder imposed by the Margraviate of Brandenburg. Salt refining in Neusalz nearly collapsed during the Thirty Years' War (1618–48), while recovery was hampered by the salt trade of Brandenburg and Poland afterwards. As the rulers of Swedish Pomerania, Sweden prevented salt from reaching the town from Stettin in 1710. Three years later Neusalz became an outpost for salt from Magdeburg and Halle.

Neusalz developed into one of the largest ports on the Silesian Oder and handled the majority of salt traffic on the river. It was annexed by the Kingdom of Prussia in 1742 according to the Treaty of Breslau. When King Frederick II of Prussia granted Neusalz town rights on 9 October 1743 and initiated plans to expand the town, it had 97 houses. A colony of the Moravian Church was also founded in the same year. After the Battle of Kunersdorf, Neusalz was plundered on 24 September 1759. Forty houses were burnt down, as was the Moravian community, which was restored in 1763.

Neusalz was administered within Landkreis Freystadt i. Niederschles. in Prussian Silesia after the Napoleonic Wars. The modern industrial development began in the 19th century when new factories, especially linen factories and steelworks, were opened. Neusalz was first connected to the Silesian railway in 1871, the same year the town became part of the German Empire during the unification of Germany. Expansion and modernization of the harbor began on 11 October 1897. Neusalz became part of the Prussian Province of Lower Silesia in 1919. A wooden bridge across the Oder, originally built in 1870, was rebuilt using reinforced concrete in 1932.

During World War II Neusalz was the site of a labor camp belonging to the Gross-Rosen concentration camp. German troops destroyed the concrete bridge on 9 February 1945, but the Soviet Red Army entered Neusalz on 13/14 February 1945. A number of buildings burnt down, including the Catholic Church.

Nowa Sól was rebuilt as an industrial and administrative center, superseding nearby Kożuchów. From 1975 to 1998 it was in the Zielona Gora Voivodeship, after which it became part of the Lubusz Voivodeship. The town is featured in the documentary 5000 Miles, about a family from Wisconsin in the United States wishing to adopt a Polish child.

Population

 1743: 800
 1787: 1,503
 1825: 2,211
 1868: 5,109
 1890: 9,075
 1905: 13,002
 1929: 14,300 to 16,300 (agglomeration)
 1939: 17,326
 1961: 27,425
 1970: 33,386

Notable people

Christian David Gebauer (1777–1831), painter
Gustav A. Schneebeli (1853–1923), politician
Otto Jaekel (1863–1929), paleontologist
Walter Thor (1870–1929), German painter and illustrator
Alfred Saalwächter (1883–1945), General Admiral executed for war crimes
Friedrich Zehm (1923–2007), German classical composer
Natias Neutert (born 1941), German artist
Seweryn Krajewski (born 1947), musician
Janusz Liberkowski (born 1953), winner of the first season of American Inventor
Józef Młynarczyk (born 1953), footballer
Bogdan Bojko (born 1959), politician
Waldemar Zboralski (born 1960), gay rights activist
Marcin Oleksy (born 1987), footballer, 2022 FIFA Puskás Award
Adam Stefanow (born 1994), snooker player

Twin towns – sister cities

Nowa Sól is twinned with:

 Achim, Germany
 Fresagrandinaria, Italy
 Püttlingen, Germany
 Saint-Michel-sur-Orge, France
 Senftenberg, Germany
 Veszprém, Hungary
 Žamberk, Czech Republic

Notes

References

External links

 
 Jewish Community in Nowa Sól on Virtual Shtetl
 

Cities and towns in Lubusz Voivodeship
Nowa Sól County